Diktaattorimies is the debut studio album by Finnish rapper Spekti. It was released on 18 October 2013. The album peaked at number 20 on the Official Finnish Album Chart.

Track listing

Charts

Release history

References

2013 debut albums
Finnish-language albums